Kenzo Goudmijn (born 18 December 2001) is a Dutch professional footballer who plays as a midfielder for Eredivisie club Excelsior, on loan from AZ.

Club career
On 7 January 2022, Goudmijn joined Excelsior on loan until the end of the season. The loan was extended for the 2022–23 season.

Personal life
Kenzo Goudmijn is the son of former AZ player Kenneth Goudmijn. Through his father, Goudmijn is of Surinamese descent.

Career statistics

Club

Honours

Netherlands U17
 UEFA European Under-17 Championship: 2018

References

External links
 Kenzo Goudmijn at ExcelsiorRotterdam.nl

2001 births
Living people
People from Hoorn
Dutch footballers
Netherlands youth international footballers
Dutch sportspeople of Surinamese descent
Association football midfielders
AZ Alkmaar players
Jong AZ players
Sparta Rotterdam players
Excelsior Rotterdam players
Eredivisie players
Eerste Divisie players
Footballers from North Holland